Slovenja Vas (in older sources Slovenja Ves) is a settlement on the right bank of the Drava River in the Municipality of Hajdina in northeastern Slovenia. The area is part of the traditional region of Styria. It is now included with the rest of the municipality in the Drava Statistical Region.

The village chapel with a small belfry dates to the early 20th century.

References

External links
Slovenja Vas on Geopedia

Populated places in the Municipality of Hajdina